Carnforth is a railway station on the Bentham and Furness Lines,  north of Lancaster, England, which serves the market town of Carnforth, Lancashire. It is owned by Network Rail and managed by Northern Trains.

History
Carnforth railway station was opened on 22 September 1846 by the Lancaster and Carlisle Railway (L&CR). It had a single platform and was a second-class station. It became a junction on 6 June 1857, when the Ulverstone and Lancaster Railway arrived from the north-west. The station served as the line's southern terminus. The Furness Railway took over the U&LR in 1862, and became the second major company operating to Carnforth.

The station was enlarged during the 1870s. In 1880, it began receiving trains from the Midland Railway, following the commissioning of a south-to-east direct curve to the Furness and Midland Joint Railway – creating a triangular junction.

The L&CR was taken over by the London and North Western Railway (LNWR), with the station operated under a joint management by the Furness Railway and LNWR – the Midland Railway having running powers into the station. Station personnel wore a uniform with the initials CJS for Carnforth: Joint Station. The Furness Railway erected a distinctive stone-built signal box to the north-west of the station in 1882, used until 1903, and this survives preserved as a grade II listed building.

A major rebuilding project, including a 300-yard long platform (currently used by northbound services), started in 1938 with government funding. With the opening of the new Platform on 3rd July 1939, it brought the number of platforms in use to six. In 1942, the government approved the rebuilding of Carnforth MPD into a major regional railway depot – the work being completed in 1944.

The film Brief Encounter was partly filmed at the station in February 1945. The station clock became a powerful icon through repeated use in the film.

Withdrawal of West Coast Main Line services
The West Coast Main Line (WCML) platforms were closed in May 1970, following the withdrawal of local stopping passenger services between Lancaster and Carlisle two years earlier. The platform walls facing the fast lines were demolished, cut back and fenced off before the commissioning of 25 kV overhead electrification in 1974. This made Carnforth a secondary line station, even though it is situated on the main line, as WCML trains cannot call.

In 2011, Network Rail rejected proposals to reopen the mainline platforms, stating that there would be too few passengers to justify slowing down mainline trains. Only the former platforms 4 (the original Furness Railway through platform) and 6 (the LMS 1939 platform) remain in use (now renumbered 1 and 2); the old 'Midland bay' (No 5), which once catered for services on the Furness and Midland Joint Railway (between Carnforth and ) has had its track removed.

Responsibility for the signalling at the station is divided between Preston PSB (main line) and the surviving manual ex-Furness Railway signal box at Carnforth Station Junction, sited just past the junction between the Barrow and Leeds lines. This has acted as the 'fringe' box to the PSB since the main line was resignalled in 1972/3. Two other boxes (F&M Junction and East Junction) were closed and demolished when the northern side of the triangle (avoiding the station) was decommissioned in 1998.

Refurbishment
After lying in a semi-derelict state for many years, the station buildings were refurbished between 2000 and 2003 and returned to commercial use. An award-winning Heritage Centre including a small railway museum and the "Brief Encounter" refreshment room, a number of shops and a travel/ticket office occupy the buildings.

The outer half of the non-operational up main (southbound) platform is in use as the access route to the subway, the active platforms and tea room. Since the privatisation of British Rail, the station has been operated by First North Western (1997-2004), First TransPennine Express (2004-2016) and Northern (2016 to date).

Facilities
The booking office is staffed part-time (six days per week, closed Sundays and public holidays). It is run by an independent retailer on behalf of the local authority but sells a full range of National Rail tickets. Both platforms have waiting rooms and step-free access (by the aforementioned subway ramps) from the station entrance, whilst train running information is provided by automated PA announcements, timetable posters and digital information screens.

There is also a micropub called The Snug which was the first of its kind to be set up in the North West and has been in the CAMRA Good Beer Guide. They host an annual beer festival inside the Heritage Centre in mid-to-late November.

To the west of the station lies Carnforth MPD, which is also the headquarters of West Coast Railways.

Services

Bentham Line

As of the May 2022 timetable change, eight trains per day (five on Sunday) operate between Lancaster and Leeds via Skipton.

Rolling stock used: Class 150 Sprinter and Class 158 Express Sprinter

Furness Line

Some trains continue to Carlisle via Whitehaven. Trains are operating to an amended timetable, owing to the COVID-19 pandemic.

Rolling stock used: Class 156 Super Sprinter and Class 195 Civity

Morecambe Branch Line
It is a parliamentary train, providing a statutory minimum service over this stretch of railway.

Gallery

See also

Listed buildings in Carnforth

References

External links 
 
 

Railway stations in Lancaster
DfT Category F1 stations
Former Furness Railway stations
Former Lancaster and Carlisle Railway stations
Former Midland Railway stations
Railway stations in Great Britain opened in 1846
Railway stations in Great Britain opened in 1867
Railway stations in Great Britain closed in 1880
Railway stations in Great Britain opened in 1880
Northern franchise railway stations
William Tite railway stations
1846 establishments in England
Stations on the West Coast Main Line
Carnforth